Jai Tyler Rowe (born 8 August 2001) is an English professional footballer who plays as a defender for  club Scunthorpe United.

Career
Jai made his League Two debut for Scunthorpe United on 3 March 2020 in an away fixture against Swindon Town. Jai started the game, but was substituted on the 73rd minute for Yasin Ben El-Mhanni. Following relegation to the National League at the end of the 2021–22 season, Rowe signed a new two-year contract.

Career statistics

References

External links

2001 births
Living people
English footballers
Association football defenders
Nuneaton Griff F.C. players
Nuneaton Borough F.C. players
Barwell F.C. players
Scunthorpe United F.C. players
Southern Football League players
English Football League players